Lone Elm Township is a township in Anderson County, Kansas, United States. As of the 2010 census, its population was 230.

Geography
According to the USGS, it contains one cemetery, Lone Elm.

References
 USGS Geographic Names Information System (GNIS)

External links
 US-Counties.com
 City-Data.com

Townships in Anderson County, Kansas
Townships in Kansas